Johan August Arfwedson (12 January 1792 – 28 October 1841) was a  Swedish chemist who discovered the chemical element lithium in 1817 by isolating it as a salt.

Life and work 

Arfwedson belonged to a wealthy bourgeois family, the son of the wholesale merchant and factory owner Jacob Arfwedson and his spouse, Anna Elisabeth Holtermann. The younger Arfwedson matriculated as a student at the University of Uppsala in 1803 (at the time, matriculating at a young age was common for aristocratic and wealthy students), completed a degree in Law in 1809 and a second degree in mineralogy in 1812. In the latter year, he received an unpaid position in the Royal Board of Mines, where he advanced to the position of notary (still without a salary) in 1814.

In Stockholm, Arfwedson knew the chemist Jöns Jakob Berzelius and received access to his private laboratory, where he discovered the element lithium in 1817, during analysis of the mineral petalite. The actual isolation of lithium metal would be done by others.

In 1818 and 1819, Arfwedson made a European journey, partly in the society of Berzelius. After coming home, Arfwedson built his own laboratory on his estate. He spent the larger part of his remaining life administering and multiplying his inherited wealth.

He was elected a member of the Royal Swedish Academy of Sciences in 1821.

The rare mineral arfvedsonite was named after him.

See also 

 Humphry Davy
 William Thomas Brande

References

Further reading 

 

1792 births
1841 deaths
19th-century Swedish chemists
Uppsala University alumni
Discoverers of chemical elements
Members of the Royal Swedish Academy of Sciences
Lithium